Fieberocapsus is a genus of true bugs belonging to the family Miridae.

The species of this genus are found in Europe and Northern America.

Species:
 Fieberocapsus flaveolus (Reuter, 1870)

References

Miridae